The Football Federation Tasmania 2013 season was the first season under the new competition format in Tasmania.  The competition consists of three major divisions across the State of Tasmania, created from the teams in the previous structure. The overall premier for the new structure qualified for the National Premier Leagues finals series, competing with the other state federation champions in a final knockout tournament to decide the National Premier Leagues Champion for 2013.

Men's Competitions

2013 NPL Tasmania

The 2013 T-League season was played over 22 rounds, from March to August 2013.

Finals

2013 Tasmanian Premier Leagues

2013 Northern Premier League

The 2013 Northern Premier League was the first edition of the new Northern Premier League as the second level domestic association football competition in Tasmania (third level overall in Australia). 9 teams competed, all playing each other twice for a total of 16 matches. No teams were promoted or relegated this season.

Finals

2013 Southern Premier League

The 2013 Southern Premier League was the first edition of the new Southern Premier League as the second level domestic association football competition in Tasmania (third level overall in Australia). 12 teams competed, all playing each other twice for a total of 22 rounds. No teams were promoted or relegated this season.

At the completion of the finals series, Hobart Zebras B, South Hobart B, NTC, Kingborough Lions and Glenorchy Knights B withdrew.

Finals

2013 Tasmanian League One

2013 Northern League One

The 2013 Northern League One was the first edition of the new Tasmanian League One as the third level domestic association football competition in Tasmania (fourth level overall in Australia). 9 teams competed, all playing each other twice for a total of 16 matches. No teams were promoted or relegated this season.

2013 Southern League One

The 2013 Southern League One was the first edition of the new Tasmanian League One as the third level domestic association football competition in Tasmania (fourth level overall in Australia). 10 teams competed, all playing each other twice for a total of 18 matches. No teams were promoted or relegated this season.

2013 Tasmanian League Two

2013 Northern League Two

The 2013 Northern League Two was the first edition of the new Tasmanian League Two as the fourth level domestic association football competition in Tasmania (fifth level overall in Australia). 6 teams competed, all playing each other four times for a total of 20 matches. No teams were promoted or relegated this season.

2013 Southern League Two

The 2013 Southern League Two was the first edition of the new Tasmanian League Two as the fourth level domestic association football competition in Tasmania (fifth level overall in Australia). 6 teams competed, all playing each other four times for a total of 20 matches. No teams were promoted or relegated this season.

2013 Tasmanian League Three

2013 Southern League Three

The 2013 Southern League Three was the first edition of the new Tasmanian League Three as the fifth level domestic association football competition in Tasmania (sixth level overall in Australia). 10 teams competed, all playing each other twice for a total of 18 matches. No teams were promoted or relegated this season.

2013 Tasmanian League Four

2013 Southern League Four

The 2013 Southern League Four was the first edition of the new Tasmanian League Four as the sixth level domestic association football competition in Tasmania (seventh level overall in Australia). 10 teams competed, all playing each other twice for a total of 18 matches. No teams were promoted or relegated this season.

Women's Competitions

2013 Northern Premier League

2014 Southern Premier League

Cup Competitions

References

2013 in Australian soccer
Football Federation Tasmania seasons